Samaritan is a Unicode block containing characters used for writing Samaritan Hebrew and Aramaic.

History
The following Unicode-related documents record the purpose and process of defining specific characters in the Samaritan block:

References 

Unicode blocks